Huaiyin may refer to:

Huai'an, named Huaiyin before 2001, a prefecture-level city in Jiangsu, People's Republic of China
Huaiyin District, Huai'an, Jiangsu, People's Republic of China
Huaiyin District, Jinan, Shandong, People's Republic of China
Chinese frigate Huaiyin (513), 1977-2013